Kamala Kotnis was an Indian actress who played roles in Telugu and Hindi movies during the 1940s. She is also notable for being Dev Anand's first heroine in Hum Ek Hai, released in 1946.

Early life
Kamala Kotnis was born as Kamalabai in Andhra Pradesh to a Telugu mother and a British father, who was in the army. As a child, she was adopted by a Zamindar. She later married Panduranga Kotnis in 1941, who was the brother of D.S. Kotnis, a leading cinematographer. Her younger sister was "connected" to  the Royal family of Ramnad estate.

Filmography
Jeevana Jyoti - (Telugu) - 1940
Bala Nagamma - (Telugu) - 1942
Chenchu Lakshmi - (Telugu) -1943 - Chenchu Lakshmi
Bhagyalakshmi - (Telugu) - 1943
Seeta Rama Jananam - (Telugu) - 1943
Tahsildar  - (Telugu) - 1944 - Rajani
Hum Ek Hai - (Hindi) - 1946
Gokul - (Hindi) - 1946
Mera Suhaag - (Hindi) - 1947
Aage Badho - (Hindi) - 1947
Seedha Raasta - (Hindi) - 1949
Sati Ahalya - (Hindi) - 1949

References
Chenchulakshmi (1943) - The Hindu
Blast from the Past: Bhagyalakshmi (1943) - The Hindu
Blast From The Past: Sri Sita Rama Jananam (1944) - The Hindu
My First Break - Dev Anand
Latha Interview - Rediff
The making of Tollywood - The New Indian Express

Anglo-Indian people
Telugu people
Indian film actresses
Actresses in Telugu cinema
Actresses in Hindi cinema
Actresses of European descent in Indian films
20th-century Indian actresses
Actresses from Andhra Pradesh
Telugu actresses